The Upper Cuts is a compilation album of house music by Alan Braxe. It was released on Play It Again Sam records in June 2005.

History
Xavier de Rosnay, one of the two members of Justice, and graphic designer So Me designed the artwork.

Track listing

References

External links

2005 compilation albums
Alan Braxe albums
PIAS Recordings compilation albums